The Rapid City Garage is a historic two-story building in Rapid City, South Dakota. It was built in 1911. The second floor was initially a hotel and later a nursing home until 1965. The building has been listed on the National Register of Historic Places since August 1, 1984.

References

	
National Register of Historic Places in Pennington County, South Dakota
Commercial buildings completed in 1911
1911 establishments in South Dakota